Gabriele Koch (born 1948 Germany) is a studio potter.
Koch studied at the University of Heidelberg 1967–73 and later attended Goldsmiths, University of London, completing a diploma in Art and Design, Ceramics 1979–81.

"earth, water, air and fire. Gabriele Koch's lovely pots speak of all those elements as vividly as any I know." Sir David Attenborough

Koch's work is in several museum collections including the Victoria and Albert Museum, London, the Fitzwilliam Museum, Cambridge,  and the Ashmolean Museum, Oxford.

References

External links 
 
 images of Koch's work on Mutual Art

Further reading 
 monograph on Koch by Edmund de Waal in the Ceramic Series published by the Aberystwyth Arts Centre

1948 births
Living people
20th-century German women artists
21st-century German women artists
Alumni of Goldsmiths, University of London
German potters